Nirthasala is a 1972 Indian Malayalam-language film, directed by A. B. Raj and produced by Sobhana Parameswaran Nair. The film stars Prem Nazir, Jayabharathi, Innocent and Adoor Bhasi in the lead roles. The film had musical score by V. Dakshinamoorthy.

Cast

Prem Nazir Magician Prof. Rajendran
Jayabharathi as Priyamvadha
Innocent as News Reporter
Adoor Bhasi as Pachu Pilla
Jose Prakash as Dhayanandhan
Prema
Sankaradi as Shekara Panikkar
Raghavan
T. S. Muthaiah as Govindha Panikkar
Abbas 
G. K. Pillai as Vamban Velayudhan
Jayakumari
K. P. Ummer as Jayadevan
Kanakadurga
Kavitha
Mathew Plathottam
Pala Thankam
Radhamani
Seema as Magician's Assistant
Sumithra
Jayshree T.

Soundtrack
The music was composed by V. Dakshinamoorthy with lyrics by Sreekumaran Thampi and P. Bhaskaran.

References

External links
 

1972 films
1970s Malayalam-language films